Yermal is a settlement in Udupi district of Karnataka state in India, between Uchila and Padubidri on National Highway 66. There are two parts of Yermal, one is Tenka (meaning "south" in Tulu) and the other Bada or Badagu (meaning "north" in Tulu).

Nearby places 
Adamaru
Kemundel
Nandikur

External links
Yermal 
Yermal Schools

Villages in Udupi district